Colonel William Digges (24 July 1697) was a politician in the Colony of Virginia and a councillor in the Province of Maryland in the late seventeenth and early eighteenth centuries. He was the son of Edward Digges (1620-1674/5), Governor of Virginia from 1655 to 1656. He was a member of the Maryland Proprietary Council until losing his office in 1689 during the Protestant Revolution, when the Calvert Proprietorship was overthrown by a Puritan revolt. He lived at Warburton Manor, an estate which is today the location of Fort Washington.

Early life

William Digges was born in Virginia in around 1651, the eldest son of Edward Digges (1620-1674/5), an English barrister and colonist who served as the Colonial Governor of Virginia from March 1655 to December 1656. Edward Digges invested heavily in planting mulberry trees and promoting the silk industry in the colony, in recognition of which he was appointed Auditor-General of Virginia.  In around 1675 Edward Digges died. As eldest son, William inherited the "E.D. Plantation", later known as Bellfield.

Career
William Digges began his career in Virginia, where he was appointed to a number of colonial offices. He became Justice of the Peace in 1671.  He was captain of horse in 1674 and was appointed Sheriff of York County in 1679. 
  He was a strong supporter of Governor Berkeley during Bacon's Rebellion.  During an encounter with Thomas Hansford, one of Bacon's foremost supporters, Digges severed Hansford's finger, and as a result was forced to flee to Maryland.

In Maryland Digges became a merchant and planter in St. Mary's County.  He married Elizabeth Sewall, widow of Dr. Jesse Wharton and a stepdaughter of Lord Baltimore, the Proprietor of Maryland.  Immediately following his marriage he was appointed to the Governor's Council.  He was also appointed Deputy Governor of Maryland. He was granted extensive land and property in Maryland, and became the "Lord of Warburton Manor" in Prince George County on the Potomac River. In 1684 he, along with Major Nicholas Sewall, served as Collector of Patuxent River.

During the Protestant Revolution in Maryland in 1689, Digges commanded the Catholic forces at St. Mary's, Maryland.  After 1689, having lost his positions, he returned to live in Virginia.  On April 20, 1693 a warrant for his arrest was issued, and on April 22, 1693, "Colonel William Digges was examined as to his knowledge of a plot to restore King James to the throne, and was bound over, with his wife, in £1,000 to appear before the next General Court."

Family life
Edward Digges married Elizabeth (Sewall) Wharton, with whom he had ten children:
William Digges, married Eleanor (Brooke) Darnall, widow of Philip Darnall
Charles Digges (1685-1744), married Susannah Maria Lowe, a daughter of Susanna Maria Bennett and Lt. Col. Henry Lowe, and a granddaughter of Richard Bennett. Charles and Susanna had two children, William and Ann Digges (1721-1814). Ann married the planter and politician Dr George Hume Steuart in 1744.
Dudley Digges
John Digges, married Mary
Nicholas Digges
Jane Digges, married Notley Rozer
Elizabeth Digges, married Anthony Neale
Ann Digges, married Henry Darnall II, eldest son of Henry Darnall (1645-1711), Deputy Governor of the Province of Maryland. Henry Darnall II was a wealthy planter.
Mary Digges
 Catherine Digges (b. 1655), married William Herndon

Death and legacy
William Digges died on 24 July 1697, leaving a will which mentioned several large Maryland plantations "and directed that his plantation on the York River be used most advantageously for his daughters."  However, the York River plantation was inherited by William's eldest son Edward, who on 21 Sept 1699 sold it to his uncle Dudley, William's younger brother.

See also
Province of Maryland
Protestant Revolution

Notes
 Browning, Charles Henry, Americans of Royal Descent, Genealogies Showing the Lineal Descent from Kings of Some American Families Clearfield; 7 edition (June 1, 2009) Retrieved 17 July 2018
 Nelker, Gladys P., The Clan Steuart, Genealogical Publishing (1970).

References

External links
History of the Digges family in Maryland

1651 births
1697 deaths
Virginia colonial people
Colonial politicians from Maryland
People of colonial Maryland
Virginia sheriffs